Ondřej Malinský (born April 7, 1983) is a Czech professional ice hockey defenceman. He played with HC Zlín in the Czech Extraliga during the 2010–11 Czech Extraliga season.

References

External links

1983 births
Czech ice hockey defencemen
PSG Berani Zlín players
Living people
HC Slovan Ústečtí Lvi players
IHC Písek players
Piráti Chomutov players
HC Sparta Praha players
HC Prostějov players
HC Havířov players
Sportovní Klub Kadaň players
SK Horácká Slavia Třebíč players
HK Poprad players
Czech expatriate ice hockey players in Slovakia